Shota Gvazava (born 26 October 1992) is a Georgian professional footballer who plays for Van.

Career
On 16 January 2023, Gvazava left Van.

On 11 March 2023, Mash'al Mubarek announced the singing of Gvazava.

References

External links 
 
 

1992 births
Living people
Footballers from Georgia (country)
Association football midfielders
Expatriate footballers from Georgia (country)
Expatriate footballers in Bulgaria
Expatriate footballers in Belarus
Expatriate footballers in Armenia
Expatriate sportspeople from Georgia (country) in Bulgaria
Expatriate sportspeople from Georgia (country) in Belarus
FC Dinamo Tbilisi players
FC Zugdidi players
FC Merani Martvili players
FC Gagra players
FC Shevardeni-1906 Tbilisi players
FC Vereya players
FC Chikhura Sachkhere players
FC Slutsk players
FC Van players